The 2010–11 ASEAN Basketball League season was the second season of competition since its establishment. A total of six teams competed the league. The regular season began on 2 October 2010 and ended on 15 January 2011, which was followed by a post-season involving the top four teams.

The Chang Thailand Slammers had the #1 seed at the conclusion of the regular season.

Teams

Regular season

Standings

Results

Playoffs
''

Semi-finals
The semi-finals is a best-of-three series, with the higher seeded team hosting Game 1, and 3, if necessary.

|}

Finals
The Finals is a best-of-three series, with the higher seeded team hosting Game 1, and 3, if necessary.

|}

References

External links
Official website

 
2010–11 in Asian basketball leagues
2009–10
2010–11 in Philippine basketball
2010–11 in Malaysian basketball
2010–11 in Indonesian basketball
2010–11 in Singaporean basketball
2010–11 in Thai basketball
Bask
Bask